Taqcharabad (also Romanized as Taqcharābād, Takhcharābād, Takhcherābād, Takhchīrābād, Takhjerābād, and Takhtjerābād; also known as Chaqcherābād and Takht jer) is a village in Kahshang Rural District, in the Central District of Birjand County, South Khorasan Province, Iran. At the 2006 census, its population was 8, consisting of 5 families.

References 

Populated places in Birjand County